Mount Thundergut is a rock peak 3 nautical miles (6 km) northeast of St. Pauls Mountain in the Asgard Range, Victoria Land. The descriptive name was given by New Zealand Antarctic Place-Names Committee (NZ-APC); when viewed from the east, the peak presents a very steep domed face with a vertical gut subject to rockfall.

Mountains of the Asgard Range
McMurdo Dry Valleys